Colin Lewes Hanks (born November 24, 1977) is an American actor. He has starred in films including Orange County, King Kong, The House Bunny, The Great Buck Howard, and the Jumanji film series. His television credits include Roswell, Band of Brothers, Dexter, Fargo, The Good Guys, Life in Pieces, Impeachment: American Crime Story, The Offer, and A Friend of the Family. 
He is the eldest son of actor Tom Hanks.

Early life
Hanks was born in Sacramento, California to actor Tom Hanks and producer and actress Samantha Lewes (born Susan Jane Dillingham). He has a sister, Elizabeth, and through his father's marriage to his stepmother, actress Rita Wilson, he has two younger half-brothers, Chester "Chet" and Truman.

Hanks attended Sacramento Country Day School, and then Chapman University, before transferring to Loyola Marymount University. He left without earning a degree.

Career

In 1999, Hanks won the role of Alex Whitmann in the science-fiction series Roswell, where he appeared for the first two seasons (making a brief appearance in the third). During that time, he acted in the teen comedies Whatever It Takes with Shane West and Get Over It with Ben Foster. Hanks also made an appearance in an episode of The OC. He appeared in part eight of HBO mini-series Band of Brothers as Lt. Hank Jones. In 2002, he starred in his first film as Shaun Brumder in Orange County, alongside Jack Black and Schuyler Fisk. The comedy features Hanks' character trying to get into Stanford University after his guidance counselor mistakenly sends out the wrong transcript. In 2005, he appeared in the remake of King Kong, playing the assistant to Jack Black's character. In 2006, Hanks had a cameo role in Black's Tenacious D in The Pick of Destiny, playing a drunken fraternity brother. He starred in the romantic comedy The House Bunny in 2008, playing Oliver, a charming manager of a nursing home and the love interest of Anna Faris' character. In 2008, Hanks began work as director on All Things Must Pass: The Rise and Fall of Tower Records, a documentary about Tower Records which ultimately premiered on March 17, 2015, at South by Southwest in Austin, Texas. The film received funding of nearly $100,000 through a Kickstarter campaign.

In 2009, Hanks appeared in The Great Buck Howard, which was produced by his father and also starred John Malkovich. He also played Father Gill, a young Roman Catholic priest, in season 2 of the TV show Mad Men. In 2012, he made his Broadway debut, acting alongside Jane Fonda in the Moisés Kaufman play 33 Variations. Hanks starred in the 2010 Fox TV series The Good Guys as young detective Jack Bailey, alongside Bradley Whitford who played an old-school detective (Dan Stark). In 2011, he starred in the indie film Lucky, alongside Ari Graynor, Ann-Margret, and Jeffrey Tambor. He also joined the cast of Dexter for season six opposite Edward James Olmos, where he portrays an art historian Travis Marshall who is involved in a murderous apocalyptic cult.

In 2014, he starred as Allison in the second season of the web series Burning Love. The same year, he also portrayed Dr. Malcolm Perry in the historical film Parkland. In 2015, he played Officer Gus Grimly in the FX television series Fargo, for which he received Critics' Choice Television Award and Primetime Emmy Award nominations.

In 2017, Hanks began a voice role in the show Talking Tom & Friends. He voices Talking Tom, the main character.

In 2018, Hanks appears as the Adult Alex Vreeke in the film Jumanji: Welcome to the Jungle, a role he would later reprise in the film's 2019 sequel, Jumanji: The Next Level.

In 2019, Hanks portrays a young Mr. Rogers on the Comedy Central show Drunk History. The same year, Hanks appears as a guest judge on Netflix's baking competition Sugar Rush in season 1, episode 7, "Sweet Geeks," where he presided over three rounds of cupcakes, desserts and ultimate cakes.

Personal life
Hanks dated Busy Philipps in the 1990s while in college. In June 2009, Hanks became engaged to former New York publicist Samantha Bryant. The couple married on May 8, 2010, in Los Angeles. Together, they have two daughters, one born in 2011, and the other born in 2013.

Hanks is a San Francisco Giants baseball fan and attended their World Series-clinching victory in Texas in November 2010. He also directed a 30 for 30 short about their disastrous Crazy Crab stint in the 1980s. He is also a fan of Liverpool FC, the San Francisco 49ers, Sacramento Kings, and Los Angeles Kings. He was the official Kevin and Bean LA Kings playoff correspondent for the 2012 and 2013 seasons.

Filmography

Film

Television

Video games

Accolades

References

External links

 

1977 births
Living people
20th-century American male actors
21st-century American male actors
American film producers
American male film actors
American male television actors
American male video game actors
American male voice actors
American people of Austrian-Jewish descent
American people of English descent
American people of Polish-Jewish descent
American people of Portuguese descent
Chapman University alumni
Film directors from California
Film producers from California
Loyola Marymount University alumni
Male actors from California
Male actors from Sacramento, California
People from Sacramento, California